The Roman Catholic Diocese of Pune is a diocese located in the city of Pune in the Ecclesiastical province of Mumbai in India.

The Poona Diocese consists of the civil districts of Pune, Satara, Solapur, Sangli & Kolhapur city. In about 1790 the Archbishop of Goa at the request of Dom Manuel Noronha, a Portuguese officer working in the Peshwa's army, sent Fr. Vincent Joaquim Menezes to minister to the Catholics working in the army of Peshwas.

Fr.Menezes resided and said Mass in the house of Dom Noronha. In 1794, with the contribution of the Catholics in the army, a small chapel was built at Nana Peth on a plot offered by the Peshwa. The first Mass was celebrated in this chapel on Christmas day. These were the beginning of the Church of the Immaculate Conception, commonly known as the City Church.

Around 1800 the Vicar Apostolic of Bombay started sending his priests to minister to the Catholics in the Scindia's army but he stopped this about 1804. In 1835 Fr. Britto, a Goan priest working under the Vicar Apostolic acted as Military Chaplain in a chapel built at Right Flank Lines, Wanwadi. In 1850, St. Patrick's Church, the present cathedral, was built.

Poona was erected into a Vicariate Apostolic by dismemberment from Bombay on March 8, 1854, and entrusted to the society of Jesus. The Vicar Apostolic of Bombay remained Administrator till the Hierarchy was established in 1886. Rt.Rev.Bernard Bieder-Linden SJ was appointed its first Bishop.

On October 20, 1953, the Catholics of Ratnagiri District and those of the Church of the Immaculate Conception, Pune, who formerly belonged to the Archdiocese of Goa, were placed under the jurisdiction of the Bishop of Poona. On November 30, 1953 the districts of Dharwar and Bijapur, formerly in the Poona Diocese were attached to the newly constituted Diocese of Belgaum.

On June 9, 1987, the Diocese of Nashik was created, comprising four districts - Nashik, Dhule, Jalgaon and Ahmednagar - of the Poona Diocese. Jesuit Thomas Bhalerao became its first bishop. St.Patrick's Cathedral was rededicated on October 22, 1987. The roof of the old Cathedral collapsed shortly before midnight on July 15, 1984. The outer walls and facade have been retained, but there is now a vault roof of concrete.

The Eparchy of Kalyan, which is contiguous with the Archdiocese of Bombay and the Dioceses of Poona and Nashik, was created on May 19, 1988. On August 24, 1988, Paul Chittilapilly was ordained Eparch of Kalyan, and the new diocese was formally inaugurated. All Catholics of the Syro-Malabar rite in the diocese came under his jurisdiction.

The First Diocesan Synod was held at Ishvani Kendra, Pune, from 11 to 14 February 2003. 144 delegates from all the 7 districts attended.

History
 1854: Established as Apostolic Vicariate of Poona from the Apostolic Vicariate of Bombay
 September 1, 1886: Promoted as Diocese of Poona

Roman Catholic Churches in Pune
St Patrick's Cathedral
 Catholics: 11,850

St. John Paul II Church - Wakad (Wakad Mass Centre)
 Catholics: 60 Families
 C/o Prerna Bhavan, S. No. 93, Tathwade Village, Near Indira College,Wakad, Pune 411033. Mobile: 99233 17352, 94232 17352
 Clergy: Rev. Fr. Simon Almeida (Priest-in-charge)
 Deacon Roy Dmonte'
 Directions

Church Of Our Lady Of Perpetual Help
 Catholics: 1,220

St. Anne's Church
 Catholics: 1,220
 Solapur Bazaar
 Pune 411 001 Tel : 26362614

St. Joseph's Church
 Catholics: 3, 800

Good Shepherd Church
 Catholics: 3,030

St. Xavier's Church
 Catholics: 1,300

Immaculate Conception Church (City Church)
 Catholics: 3,214

St. Teresa's Church
 Catholics: 1,450

St. Ignatius Church
 Catholics: 6,964

Sacred Heart Church
 Catholics: 7,625

Holy Cross Church
 Catholics: 2,823

St. Francis de Sales Church 
 Catholics: 4,200

St. Anthony's Church
Our Lady Consoler of the Afflicted Church
St. Francis Xavier's Church
 Catholics: 3,200

Infant Jesus Church
 Catholics: 1,220

St. Sebastian's Church
 Catholics: 940

St. Jude Church
 Catholics: 1,035

St. Joseph's Church
 Catholics: 1,000

Divine Mercy Church
Christ The King Church
Our Lady of Mount Carmel Church
St. Sebastian Chapel
 NDA, Khadakvasla, Pune 411 023 c/o 25675681

Holy Family Chapel
Resurrection Chapel
Mother Teresa Centre
God The Holy Spirit Chapel - Sinhagad road , vitthalwadi

Bishops (Latin Rite)

Bishops of Poona  

Bernhard Beiderlinden, S.J. (20 Dec 1886 - 1907 )
Heinrich Döring, S.J. (7 Sep 1907 - 16 Jun 1921), appointed titular archbishop; later returned here as Archbishop (personal title) (14 Jul 1927 - 15 Jan 1948)
Andrew Alexis D'Souza (12 May 1949 - 12 Jun 1967 )
William Zephyrine Gomes (12 Jun 1967 - 1 Dec 1976 )
Valerian D'Souza (7 Jul 1977 - 2009) 
Thomas Dabre (2009 -)

Other priests of this diocese who became bishops
Lourdunada Daniel, appointed Bishop of Amravati in 2007
Anthony Alwyn Fernandes Barreto, appointed Bishop of Sindhudurg in 2005
Michael Rodrigues, appointed Bishop of Belgaum in 1953

References

External links
 GCatholic.org 
 Catholic Hierarchy 
  Diocese website 
 History 
 http://www.poonadiocese.org/parish/centres/Pune.aspx

Poona
Christianity in Maharashtra
Religious organizations established in 1854
Poona
1854 establishments in India
1854 establishments in British India